Matthew Alan Shaw (born 7 May 1984) is an English former footballer. During his career, he has played in the English Football League for Wrexham and Blackpool.

Career
Originally a Sheffield Wednesday youngster, he was released by the club in 2004 before he would join League One Wrexham on non-contract terms. He would make one appearance for the Welsh club, coming on as a 90th minute substitute in a 2-1 win against Colchester United.

After leaving Wrexham, Shaw would join home-town club Blackpool originally on non-contract terms, however, after one appearance in the FA Cup, he would sign a long-term deal with the club.

Shaw would leave Blackpool in 2006, joining Morecambe where he would stay for half a season during the season Morecambe won the Conference National play-offs.

He then played for Morcambe's conference rivals Northwich Victoria, who he played for in the second half of the 2006–07 season.

Then he played for Kirkham and Wesham before getting injured and being forced to retire.

References

External links

Matthew Shaw at BlackpoolFC.co.uk

1984 births
Living people
English Football League players
Wrexham A.F.C. players
Blackpool F.C. players
Morecambe F.C. players
Northwich Victoria F.C. players
Association football midfielders
English footballers
National League (English football) players